Euonymus acuminifolius is a plant in the family Celastraceae. The specific epithet  is from the Latin meaning "long-pointed leaves".

Description
The flowers are purplish-red.

Distribution and habitat
Euonymus acuminifolius grows naturally in Sumatra, Borneo and Sulawesi. Its habitat is montane forest at around  altitude.

References

acuminifolius
Flora of Sumatra
Flora of Borneo
Flora of Sulawesi
Plants described in 1951